All in One is an 11-minute 1938 sponsored film which compares dogs to the latest cars. It starts off with a sheep dog, then talks about how dogs are man's best friend. It then has a group of kids building a go-kart with some dogs pulling it and then talks about the features of latest cars. It's actually an advertisement for Chevrolet and was produced by the Jam Handy Organization.

External links
 
 

1938 films
Chevrolet
1938 short films
American black-and-white films
Sponsored films
Jam Handy Organization films
Articles containing video clips
Promotional films
1930s English-language films